Almoloya is a Mexican toponym from the Nahuatl atl (water) and molonhi (spring). It may refer to:

Estado de México:
Almoloya de Juárez, site of a federal maximum security prison
Almoloya de Alquisiras
Almoloya de las Granadas
Almoloya del Río
Hidalgo:
Almoloya, Hidalgo